Shwemokhtaw Pagoda is a Buddhist pagoda in Pathein, Myanmar (formerly Bassein, Burma). The pagoda is bounded by Merchant St, Strand, Mahabandoola and Shwezedi Roads. At the southern pavilion of the pagoda is a revered image of the Buddha, Thiho-shin Phondawpyi. The pagoda is home to a pagoda festival during the full moon of Kason (April/May), marking Visakha.

According to tradition, the pagoda was founded by King Asoka of India in 305 BC.

Notes

References

Religious buildings and structures completed in 1115
Pagodas in Myanmar